Windermere is a town in the civil parish of Windermere and Bowness, in the South Lakeland District of Cumbria, England. In the 2001 census the parish had a population of 8,245, increasing at the 2011 census to 8,359. It lies about half a mile (1 km) east of the lake, Windermere. 

Although the town Windermere does not touch the lake (it took the name of the lake when the railway line was built in 1847 and the station was called "Windermere"), it has now grown together with the older lakeside town of Bowness-on-Windermere, though the two retain distinguishable town centres. Tourism is popular in the town owing to its proximity to the lake and local scenery. Boats from the piers in Bowness sail around the lake, many calling at Ambleside or at Lakeside where there is a restored railway. Windermere Hotel opened at the same time as the railway.

The civil parish contains both towns, the village of Troutbeck Bridge to the north and several hamlets, including Storrs to the south and Heaning to the east. Belle Isle and part of the lake are also within its boundaries. The civil parish changed its name from Windermere to Windermere and Bowness on 29 July 2020.

History
Historically a part of the county of Westmorland, Windermere town was known as Birthwaite prior to the arrival of the Kendal and Windermere Railway, which stimulated its development. Windermere station offers train and bus connections to the surrounding area, Manchester Airport and the West Coast Main Line.

The geological formations around the area take their name from the town. They are called the Windermere Group of sedimentary rocks.

Etymology

The word "Windermere" is thought to translate as "Winand or Vinand's lake". The specific has usually been identified with an Old Swedish personal name Vinandr. The other possibility is for a Continental Germanic name Wīnand.
The second element is Old English 'mere', meaning 'lake' or 'pool'.
There is a reference to "Wynandermer" in 1396.

Governance
Windermere was from 1894 to 1974 governed by an urban district council which in 1905 absorbed the former Bowness-on-Windermere UDC although Bowness remained a separate civil parish until 1974. Windermere UDC had slight boundary changes in 1934 and was abolished by the Local Government Act 1972 replacing it with South Lakeland District Council. The Windermere coat of arms was commissioned in 1968 and designed by local schoolgirl, Sheila West.

Transport

Windermere railway station was built in 1847 and was the reason the town was established. The station serves trains run by Northern to Oxenholme on the West Coast Main Line. There are also services that run on further to Manchester Airport.

The town is near the A591 road, a major road running through the Lake District from Kendal to Keswick.

Education
There are three primary schools located in the town. Secondary education is provided by The Lakes School (state) and Windermere School (independent, ages 2–18), both of which are located on the outskirts.

Notable People
 Thomas Gardner (born 1996) - filmmaker.
 The Rt. Hon. Dr David Clark, Baron Clark of Windermere, lives in Windermere.

See also

Bowness-on-Windermere
Windermere
Listed buildings in Windermere, Cumbria (town)

References

External links

Windermere Town Council
  Cumbria County History Trust: Windermere and Bowness
The Cumbria Directory - Windermere

 
Towns in Cumbria
Westmorland
Civil parishes in Cumbria